Liu Luyang (born June 10, 1976) is a Chinese ice dancer. With partner Zhao Xiaolei, she is the 1986 Asian Winter Games champion. They placed 19th at the 1988 Winter Olympics and Liu was 11 years old at the time. Before teaming up with Zhao, she competed with Li Xiangdong. They placed 15th at the 1984 World Junior Figure Skating Championships.

Results
(with Zhao)

References
 Skatabase: 1980s Olympics Results
 Historic World Junior Championships results
 

Chinese female ice dancers
Olympic figure skaters of China
Figure skaters at the 1988 Winter Olympics
1976 births
Living people
Asian Games medalists in figure skating
Figure skaters at the 1986 Asian Winter Games
Medalists at the 1986 Asian Winter Games
Asian Games gold medalists for China